Ali Hassan Ali Salmeen Al-Bloushi (born 4 February 1995) is an Emirati professional footballer who plays for Al-Wasl and the United Arab Emirates national team.

International career

International goals
Score and result list United Arab Emirates' goal tally first.

External links

References

Emirati footballers
1995 births
Living people
Al-Wasl F.C. players
Place of birth missing (living people)
Emirati people of Baloch descent
UAE Pro League players
Association football midfielders
2019 AFC Asian Cup players
United Arab Emirates international footballers
United Arab Emirates youth international footballers